The Dominican honours system is a means of rewarding individuals' personal bravery, achievement or service to the Dominican Republic. The system consists of two types of awards: decorations and medals.

Brief history
These were introduced within the Rafael Trujillo regime. Some of them were named after him; those were rescinded after his death on 30 May 1961.

Currents orders and medals
These are the orders and medals actually awarded by the government of the Dominican Republic:

Orders
 The Order of Merit of Duarte, Sánchez and Mella (as Order of Merit of Duarte in 1931, name expanded 1954)
 The Order of Christopher Columbus (1937)
 The Order of Military Merit (1930)
 The Order of Air Merit (1952)
 The Order of Naval Merit (1954)
 The Captain General Santana Military Order of Heroism (1954)

Medals
 The Medal for Valor (1939)
 The Medal of Merit of the Dominican Woman (1985)

Old orders and Medals
The following orders and medals were awarded by the government of the Dominican Republic until the death of Rafael Trujillo:
 The 23rd of February 1930 Commemorative Medal (1937)
 The Order of Trujillo (1938)
 The Order of the Generalissimo (1938)
 The President Trujillo Grand Cordon (1952)
 The Order of the National Benefactor (1955)
 The 14th of June Order of Merit (1961)

External links

Secretaría de Estado de Relaciones Exteriores (Law) (In Spanish)
Secretaría de Estado de Relaciones Exteriores (Reglament) (In Spanish)
Medals of the Dominican Republic